Skater Girl is a 2021 coming-of-age sports drama film directed by Manjari Makijany. The cast includes newcomers Rachel Sanchita Gupta and Shafin Patel, and also stars Amrit Maghera, Jonathan Readwin and Waheeda Rehman. It was written by Manjari and Vinati Makijany, who co-produced the film through their Indian production company Mac Productions. It was released on 11 June 2021 by Netflix.

Plot
In the present day in a remote village in Rajasthan, teenager Prerna is living a life bound by tradition and duty to her parents.

When London-bred advertising executive Jessica arrives in the village to learn more about her late father's childhood, Prerna and the other local children are introduced to an exciting new adventure thanks to Jessica and her old friend Erick who cruises into town on a skateboard.

The kids become infatuated with the sport, skating through the village, disrupting everything and everyone around them.

Determined to empower and encourage their newfound passion, Jessica sets out on an uphill battle to build the kids their own skatepark, leaving Prerna with a difficult choice between conforming to society's expectations of her or living out her dream of competing in the National Skateboarding Championships.

Cast
 Rachel Sanchita Gupta as Prerna
 Shraddha Gaikwad as Gunjan
 Amrit Maghera as Jessica
 Waheeda Rehman as Maharani
 Shafin Patel as Ankush
 Anurag Arora as Mahesh
 Jonathan Readwin as Erick
 Swati Das as Shanti
 Ankit Rao as Vikram
 Ambrish Saxena as Ramkesh
 Vivek Yadav as Tipu
 Sohan Suhalka as Vishwinath
 Sahidur Rahaman as Police Officer

Production
Production of the film under the title Desert Dolphin took place in Khempur, a village near Udaipur, Rajasthan which was also the location for the film The Best Exotic Marigold Hotel. As the central set of the film, the producers built Rajasthan's first and India's largest skatepark in Khempur. The film brought together crew from the US, Canada and India. Production on the film completed in early 2020.

The production employed approximately five hundred cast and crew including over three hundred and fifty village locals. Over three thousand children were auditioned, many of them skaters from skate communities across India. The filmmakers spent over a year researching, writing and meeting with teenage girls and boys in Rajasthan to write Prerna and Ankush’s characters as authentically as possible. Fifty-five skaters from across India featured in the movie including thirty-four local skaters from Khempur.

Post Production was completed in Los Angeles at Warner Bros. facilities.

Release
The film was released by Netflix on 11 June 2021.

Reception

Critical reception
On the review aggregator website Rotten Tomatoes, 88% of 17 critics’ reviews are positive, with an average rating of 6.90/10.

Writing for RogerEbert.com, critic Sheila O’Malley said the film “captures the iconoclastic freedom and rebellion skateboarding has so often represented, and it joins a long line of rousing skate films.” O’Malley added,Newcomer [Rachel Sanchita] Gupta is a revelation, as is [Shafin] Patel, who plays her mischievous and sweet younger brother. Both understand all of the complexities of this story and give beautiful and powerful performances. There may be one too many obstacles placed in Prerna's way…stacking the deck against her so there will be an even bigger payoff. But overall "Skater Girl" is so gratifying it doesn't matter.

Source of inspiration
Following the release of the film's trailer, netizens familiar with the story of Ulrike Reinhard's skatepark and Asha Gond's rise as one of India's top skateboarders, found similarities between the movie and Gond's life. While Gond was auditioned for the film, director Makijany denied that the movie was about Gond stating, "the film is not a biopic based on anyone's life story nor is it a documentary. It is not Gond or Reinhard's story."

References

External links
 
 

Hindi-language Netflix original films
2021 films
English-language Netflix original films
Indian direct-to-video films
2021 drama films
2020s sports drama films
2020s coming-of-age drama films
2021 directorial debut films
Skateboarding films
Films about women's sports
2020s feminist films
Films set in India
Films shot in Rajasthan
Films directed by Manjari Makijany